Remember Me is a 2010 American coming-of-age romantic drama film directed by Allen Coulter and written by Will Fetters. It stars Robert Pattinson, Emilie de Ravin, Chris Cooper, Lena Olin, and Pierce Brosnan. The film received negative reviews from critics, with much of the criticism centered on its twist ending which divided audiences.

Plot

In New York, Ally is a student at NYU, and lives with her father, Neil, a NYPD detective. Tyler Hawkins audits classes at NYU and works at the university bookshop. He and his sister Caroline have a strained relationship with their workaholic businessman father, Charles. 

One night, Tyler and his roommate Aidan get involved in somebody else's fight, and are arrested by Neil. Aidan calls Charles to bail Tyler out, but he does not stick around to have a conversation with his father. When Aidan sees Neil dropping Ally off, he realizes she is his daughter. So he approaches Tyler with the idea to get back at the detective by sleeping with and dumping Ally. Tyler and she go to dinner and continue seeing each other.

After noticing a tattoo on Tyler's chest reading "Michael," Tyler reveals to Ally that his brother Michael died by suicide years ago; Ally later reveals that her mother was mugged and fatally shot in front of her 10 years ago. Aidan turns up at Tyler's apartment, meets Ally for the first time, and convinces the pair to go to a party, where she drinks too much. The following morning, after her father hits her when she stands up to him, Ally flees back to Tyler's apartment, where the pair consummate their relationship.

Caroline, a budding 12 y.o. artist, is featured in an art show, and Tyler tries to get their father to attend. When he fails to show up, Caroline is heartbroken, so Tyler confronts him in a boardroom filled with people. He accuses his father of willingly distancing himself from his children to avoid feeling the pain of losing another child, and father and son come to blows. 

When Neil's partner recognizes Tyler with Ally on a train, Neil breaks into Tyler's apartment. Recognizing him, he finds out Tyler's initial reason for meeting Ally, and violently confronts him, which forces Tyler to confess to a distraught Ally. Aidan visits Ally at her father's home to explain it's his fault, and Tyler is genuinely in love with her.

Caroline is bullied by classmates at a birthday party where they cut a chunk of her hair off. Ally and Aidan visit Tyler's mother's apartment, where Caroline is sobbing. Tyler accompanies his sister back to school, and following further bullying, Tyler turns violent, ending up in custody. Charles is impressed that Tyler stood up for his sister, and they connect. Charles asks Tyler to meet his lawyers at his office.

Tyler spends the night with Ally, and they confess their love for each other. The next morning, Charles calls Tyler to let him know that he will be late, as he is taking Caroline to school; Tyler is happy that their dad is spending time with his sister, and tells him that he will wait in his office. He looks on Charles's computer, featuring a slideshow of pictures with Tyler, Michael, and Caroline when they were younger. 

Caroline arrives at her classroom, where the teacher writes the date on the blackboard as Tuesday, September 11, 2001. Tyler looks out the window of his father's office, which is revealed to be located on the north edge of 101st floor in the North Tower of the World Trade Center.

A voice-over of Tyler's diary declares his love for his brother Michael, forgiving him for killing himself. Tyler is buried next to Michael. Some time later, Caroline and Charles seem to have a healthy father-daughter relationship. Aidan, who has since gotten a tattoo of Tyler's name on his arm, is working hard in school, and Ally gets on the subway at the same spot where her mother was killed.

Cast

 Robert Pattinson as Tyler Hawkins
 Emilie de Ravin as Alyssa "Ally" Craig
 Chris Cooper as Sgt. Neil Craig, Ally's father, an NYPD detective
 Lena Olin as Diane Hirsch, Tyler and Caroline's mother
 Tate Ellington as Aidan Hall, Tyler's roommate and best friend
 Ruby Jerins as Caroline Hawkins, Tyler's younger sister

 Pierce Brosnan as Charles Hawkins, Tyler and Caroline's father
 Peyton List as Samantha, a girl from Caroline's school who constantly bullies her.
 Kate Burton as Janine, Charles' executive assistant
 Gregory Jbara as Les Hirsch, Diane's new partner

Premiere
The film premiered on March 1, 2010, at the Paris Theatre in New York City, and received its wide release on March 12, 2010. It is rated 12A in the UK and PG-13 in the United States.

Home media
Summit Entertainment announced the DVD and Blu-ray release of June 22, 2010.

Reception

Critical response
Review aggregator Rotten Tomatoes reports that 26% of 140 critics gave the film a positive review, with an average rating of 4.5/10. The site's critics consensus reads, "Its leads are likeable, but Remember Me suffers from an overly maudlin script and a borderline offensive final twist." Metacritic gives it a weighted average score of 40 out of 100, based on 29 critics, indicating "mixed or average reviews". Audiences polled by CinemaScore gave the film an average grade of "B" on an A+ to F scale.

Todd McCarthy gave the film a mixed review in Variety, writing "The modestly scaled film delivers some moving and affecting moments amid a preponderance of scenes of frequently annoying people behaving badly."  Andrea Gronvall gave a similar assessment in The Chicago Reader, writing "Allen Coulter directed this morose and sluggish drama, which gets more mileage from Pattinson's anguished profile than from Will Fetters's thunderously overwritten screenplay." Derek Malcolm wrote in the London Evening Standard, "Decently shot and directed as it is, it lacks any real flame." Kirk Honeycutt of The Hollywood Reporter gave the film a positive review, stating the "scenes between Pattinson and de Ravin exude genuine charm." Honeycutt goes on to say that the score and cinematography brought "notable sparkle to this heartfelt drama."

Jake Coyle of the Associated Press did not favor the film and said the "most pleasing thing about [the film] is its boldness. It may be affected, but [it] is at least aiming for an intriguing character study — a positive sign in the young career of Pattinson," who he says steps away from "Twilight, apparently in search of his Five Easy Pieces or Rebel Without a Cause." Lisa Schwarzbaum of Entertainment Weekly gave the film a D+, calling it a "shameless contraption of ridiculously sad things befalling attractive people." Schwarzbaum was also critical of Pattinson's acting and the script. Wesley Morris of The Boston Globe gave the film a half star out of four, commenting that the film "crassly repurposes tragedy to excuse its cliches."

Several critics also found the movie's invocation of the September 11 attacks on the World Trade Center offensive and exploitative, such as Lisa Kennedy of The Denver Post, who wrote, "The finale manages to be tasteful and exploitative at the same time. It touts forgiveness while being mildly infuriating. Such is the danger of borrowing from the enormous to merely entertain. If that. Forgettable should be the last thing a movie touching on the events of 9/11 should be. Yet 'Remember Me' is just that." Elizabeth Weitzman of the New York Daily News also denounced the film's ending, writing, "There's no shame in exploring tragedy through art. But exploiting it to make your very ordinary movie feel more important? That's another story."

Roger Ebert generally liked the film, giving it three out of four stars and characterizing it as a "well-made movie. I cared about the characters. I felt for them. Liberate them from the plot's destiny, which is an anvil around their necks, and you might have something" but goes on to say it "tries to borrow profound meaning, but succeeds only in upstaging itself so overwhelmingly that its characters become irrelevant".

Box office
Remember Me opened in fifth place, behind Alice in Wonderland, Green Zone, She's Out of My League, and Shutter Island. It grossed $8,089,139 in its first weekend. As of July 6, Remember Me accumulated a total of $56,032,889 at the box office.

Accolades

Soundtrack
The official Remember Me soundtrack album was released on March 9, 2010. An album of the score composed by Marcelo Zarvos was also released. The movie contained 26 credited songs, while the soundtrack album contained 14 of them, including songs by Sigur Rós, The Beta Band, Ani Difranco, Supergrass and National Skyline. An Indian/Pakistani song, "Saason ki Mala Peh Simroon" by Nusrat Fateh Ali Khan, is also heard in the movie when Tyler takes Ally on their first date at Gandhi Restaurant.

References

External links

 
 
 

2010 films
2010 romantic drama films
2010s coming-of-age drama films
American coming-of-age drama films
American romantic drama films
Coming-of-age romance films
Films based on the September 11 attacks
Films directed by Allen Coulter
Films scored by Marcelo Zarvos
Films set in 1991
Films set in New York City
Films shot in New York City
Summit Entertainment films
2010s English-language films
2010s American films